Thomas Fraser Rogers (born 7 February 1999) is an Australian cricketer.

Rogers has played T20 for the Melbourne Stars since the 2021-2022 season. He made his debut on 2 January 2022, as one of six replacement players called into the squad in January 2022 during the 2021–22 Big Bash League season after ten members of the original squad became unavailable due to contracting COVID-19. Rogers was subsequently ruled out of the Stars’ next game against the Melbourne Renegades only one day later after testing positive to COVID-19.

References

1999 births
Living people
Melbourne Stars cricketers
Australian cricketers